Bruno Abbatini (June 30, 1938 Genzano di Roma Italy, – 31 March 2017 Albano Laziale, Italy) was an Italian football player, who played as midfielder and forward and has been a trainer.

He played for Ostia Mare, Tevere Roma, AS Roma, Cesena, Padova, Avellino and Sora. He was a trainer at Cynthia, Aprilia, Nemi, Viterbese and Cassino.

References

Further information 
100anni.padovacalcio.it profil

1938 births
2017 deaths
Italian footballers
Association football midfielders
Association football forwards
A.S. Ostia Mare Lido Calcio players
A.S. Roma players
Calcio Padova players
Italian football managers